Agency 30 is a First Nations reserve on the Aulneau Peninsula of Lake of the Woods in northwestern Ontario. It is shared by 13 First Nations:

 Animakee Wa Zhing 37 First Nation
 Big Grassy First Nation
 Buffalo Point First Nation
 Iskatewizaagegan 39 Independent First Nation
 Anishnaabeg of Naongashiing
 Naotkamegwanning First Nation
 Niisaachewan Anishinaabe Nation
 Northwest Angle 33 First Nation
 Obashkaandagaang Bay First Nation
 Ojibways of Onigaming First Nation
 Shoal Lake 40 First Nation
 Wabaseemoong Independent Nations and
 Anishinabe of Wauzhushk Onigum

External links
 Aboriginal Affairs and Northern Development Canada profile

Anishinaabe reserves in Ontario
Communities in Kenora District
Indian reserves in Ontario
Ojibwe in Canada
Saulteaux